Thimma Bhupala (died 1491) was the elder son of Saluva Narasimha Deva Raya, the King of Vijayanagara Empire. During the reign of his father, he was holding the office of Yuvaraja Prince Thimma succeeded his father in 1491 but was soon murdered by an army commander during a period of political unrest in Vijayanagara. He was succeeded by his younger brother Narasimha Raya II.

Notes

References
 Suryanath U. Kamath, A Concise history of Karnataka from pre-historic times to the present, Jupiter books, MCC, Bangalore, 2001 (Reprinted 2002) OCLC: 7796041 

People of the Vijayanagara Empire
Indian Hindus
Hindu monarchs
1491 deaths
Year of birth unknown
Murdered Indian monarchs
15th-century murdered monarchs